This is a list of cities and colonies of Phoenicia in modern-day Lebanon, coastal Syria, northern Israel and Palestine, as well as cities founded or developed by the Phoenicians in Eastern Mediterranean area, North Africa, Southern Europe, and the islands of the Mediterranean Sea.

Levant

Lebanon
Tyre - One of the two leading-city states of Phoenicia and one of the most important ports in ancient Phoenicia, and Lebanon today.
Sydon - One of the two leading city-states of Phoenicia
Ampi
Amia
Arqa
Baalbek
Botrys
Berut
Gebal - One of the oldest sites of civilization
Sarepta
Tripoli, Lebanon

Syria
Arvad
Ugarit
Latakia - also known by its Phoenician name, Ramitha
Tartus
Amrit
Carne

Israel and Palestine
Achziv
Acre
Atlit
Belus
Crocodeilopolis
Dora
Elyakhin
Kabri
Michal
Haifa - Tel Shikmona
Jaffa
Reshef
Stratonos pyrgos
Tell Abu Hawam
Tel Mevorakh

Eastern Mediterranean

Turkey
Myriandus - in modern-day Turkey
Sam'al - Cilicia; in modern-day Turkey. Fortress city protecting the trade route to Anatolia
Karatepe
Finike - historically known as Phoenicus

Cyprus
Kition, also known as Citium (in Latin).
Salamis.
Lapethos.
Tamassos.
Idalium.

North Africa

Algeria
Tipaza
Russicada
Icosium

Libya
Oea
Sabratha
Leptis Magna - major city on the Libyan coastline

Morocco
Lixus
Mogador
Tangier
Mehidya (ancient Thymaterion)
El-Jadida (ancient Gytte)
Oualidia (ancient Melitta)
Agadir

Morocco or Mauritania
 Cerne (Unknown whether Cerne was in Morocco or Mauritania)

Tunisia
Carthage - the most powerful of the Phoenician settlements, eventually being destroyed by the Romans
Utica - earliest settlement in Africa
Hippo Diarrhytus - now Bizerte, the northernmost city in Africa
Hadrumetum
Leptis Parva
Thapsus
Kerkouane
Zama Regia - the last place Hannibal fought and the place where his first and only major defeat occurred
Vaga

Europe / Elsewhere

France
Aleria

Italy
Motya
Soluntum
Lilybaeum, also known as Marsala
Lampas (ancient city) (Lampedusa)
Kosyra (Pantelleria)
Nora
Sulcis
Tharros
Olbia
Cagliari
Palermo

Malta
Mdina
Rabat
Burmula, (Bormla/Cospicua)De Soldanis/G.F. Abela/Achille Ferris

Portugal
Lisbon

Spain
Cádiz also known as Gades - earliest Phoenician settlement in Spain
Cartagena - the capital city founded by Hamilcar Barca of Carthage after conquering the Iberian tribes
Kartuba
Almuñécar
Rusadir
La Fonteta (Guardamar del Segura)
Trayamar
Baria-Villaricos
Abdera
Málaga
Huelva
Ibiza
Lebrija
San Roque

Sources
Phoenicia - From the Encyclopedia of the Orient

References

 01
Phoenician
Phoenician cities
Phoenician city-states
Ancient Lebanon
Port cities of the Mediterranean Sea